Tortoise is an American post-rock band formed in Chicago, Illinois in 1990. The band incorporates krautrock, dub, minimal music, electronica and jazz into their music, a combination sometimes termed "post-rock". Tortoise have been consistently credited for the rise of the post-rock movement in the 1990s.

History

1990s 
The group's origins lie in the late 1980s pairing of Doug McCombs (bassist with Eleventh Dream Day) and drummer John Herndon, who initially wanted to establish themselves as a freelance rhythm section (like reggae legends Sly and Robbie). The idea did not come to fruition, but their interest in grooving rhythms, as well as their recording studio knowledge led to partnerships with drummer John McEntire and bassist Bundy K. Brown (both formerly of Bastro and Gastr Del Sol) joining, followed by percussionist Dan Bitney. Though songs are credited to all the musicians, McEntire became perceived as the group's guiding force, as his contributions mainly took the form of being the recording engineer and mixer.

Their first single was issued in 1993, and their self-titled debut album followed a year later. Instrumental and mostly mid-tempo, Tortoise slowly garnered praise and attention, notably for its unusual instrumentation (two bass guitars, three percussionists switching between drums, vibraphones and marimbas). A remix album followed, Rhythms, Resolutions and Clusters.

Brown left and was replaced by David Pajo (formerly of Slint) for 1996's Millions Now Living Will Never Die, which showed up on many year-end best of lists, and the 20-minute Djed was described by critic John Bush as proof that "Tortoise made experimental rock do double duty as evocative, beautiful music." Also in 1996, the band contributed to the AIDS benefit album Offbeat: A Red Hot Soundtrip produced by the Red Hot Organization.

They released a Japanese-only compilation featuring tracks from the eponymous debut, Rhythms, singles and compilation appearances, named A Digest Compendium of the Tortoise's World on November 21, 1996.

In 1998, Tortoise released TNT, arguably their most jazz-inflected album. Jeff Parker had joined as a guitarist alongside Pajo, who left the band following the album's completion.

2000s–present 
2001 led to Standards, where Tortoise incorporated more electronic sounds and post-production into its music than in previous works. In 2001, the band curated an edition of the British All Tomorrow's Parties festival. They then returned in 2004 to curate another day of the same event.

It's All Around You was released in 2004. In 2006, Tortoise collaborated with Bonnie 'Prince' Billy on an album of covers entitled The Brave and the Bold, and released A Lazarus Taxon, a box set containing two CDs of single tracks and remixes, a third CD with an expanded Rhythms, Resolutions and Clusters (out of print) and a DVD of videos and film of live performances. In 2001, the band recorded "Didjeridoo" for the Red Hot Organization's compilation album Red Hot + Indigo, a tribute to Duke Ellington, which raised money for various charities devoted to AIDS related causes.

Bitney and McEntire also contributed to the Bright Eyes album Cassadaga. The group has worked with multi-instrumentalist Paul Duncan of the band Warm Ghost.

Tortoise released their penultimate album, Beacons of Ancestorship, on June 23, 2009.  The band toured the Midwestern US in September and October 2009, and then in Europe in November and December. The band performed at the ATP New York 2010 music festival, which was held in Monticello, New York.

In 2012, Tortoise wrote and recorded the soundtrack to Eduardo Sánchez's Lovely Molly, a psychological horror film partly inspired by traditional folk songs. A seventh studio album, The Catastrophist, was released by Thrill Jockey in early 2016, preceded by the single Gesceap.

Musical style
As Tortoise rose to prominence in their early career, their often instrumental music has been noted for its ambiguous categorization. The members have roots in Chicago's fertile music scene, playing in various indie rock and punk rock groups. Tortoise was among the first American indie rock bands to incorporate styles closer to krautrock, dub, minimal music, electronica and various jazz styles, rather than the strong rock and roll roots that had dominated the genre.

Tortoise has been cited as one of the prime forces behind the development and popularity of the post-rock movement. CMJ writer Jim Allen highlighted the influence of progressive rock on Tortoise's post-rock style.

Other groups related to Tortoise include The Sea and Cake, Brokeback, Slint, Isotope 217, Chicago Odense Ensemble, Tar Babies, and the Chicago Underground Duo. Tortoise records on the Thrill Jockey label.

Discography

Studio albums
 Tortoise (1994)
 Millions Now Living Will Never Die (1996)
 TNT (1998)
 Standards (2001)
 It's All Around You (2004)
 Beacons of Ancestorship (2009)
 The Catastrophist (2016)

Other releases
 In the Fishtank (1999) – EP, collaboration with The Ex
 "Gently cupping the chin of the ape" (2001) – two track tour CD with enhanced content
 The Brave and the Bold (2006) – covers album, collaboration with Bonnie 'Prince' Billy
 A Lazarus Taxon (2006) – compilation box set of rare material, 3 CDs and 1 DVD
 Why Waste Time? (2010) – Japan-only tour EP, Enhanced CD

Remix albums and compilations
 Rhythms, Resolutions & Clusters (1995) – remix album
 A Digest Compendium of the Tortoise's World (1996) – Japan-only compilation featuring tracks from debut album, remixes and singles
 Remixed (1998) – remix album (2001 re-release with additional remix from autechre) 
Metro: The Official Bootleg Series, Volume 1 (2010) – live compilation, one Tortoise track
Grand Theft Auto: Chinatown Wars (2009) – a dedicated Tortoise radio station (28-minute track) in the IOS/ANDROID/PSP version
 Yanni Live at the Acropolis (2010) – part of Beck's online musical project Record Club; collaboration with Beck, Thurston Moore and Brian LeBarton

Singles and music videos
 1996 – "Glass Museum"
 1996 – "Dear Grandma and Papa"
 1998 – "The Suspension Bridge at Iguazú Falls"
 1998 – "Four-day Interval"
 2001 – "Seneca"
 2004 – "Salt the Skies"
 2004 – "It's All Around You"
 2009 – "Prepare your Coffin"
 2016 – "Yonder Blue"

References

External links

American post-rock groups
Musical groups established in 1990
Musical groups from Chicago
American art rock groups
Thrill Jockey artists
Tortoise (band) members
City Slang artists